Prairie Dog is  the eighth album by American pianist and arranger Duke Pearson, and his second for the Atlantic label, recorded in 1966.

Reception
The Allmusic review by Thom Jurek awarded the album 3½ stars stating "this is Pearson in full soul-jazz mode, driven deeply by the blues, with an all-star band... This is as fine as any date Pearson released for Atlantic, and grooves all the way through, seamlessly".

Track listing
All compositions by Duke Pearson except as indicated
 "The Fakir" - 5:14  
 "Prairie Dog" - 6:45  
 "Hush-A-Bye" (Sammy Fain, Jerry Seelen) - 4:11  
 "Soulin'" (Joe Henderson) - 6:59  
 "Little Waltz" (Ron Carter) - 6:04  
 "Angel Eyes" (Earl Brent, Matt Dennis) - 5:28  
Recorded in New York City in 1966

Personnel
Duke Pearson - piano, (trio track 6), celeste, (track 3), arranger
Johnny Coles - trumpet
James Spaulding - alto saxophone, flute
George Coleman - tenor saxophone
Harold Vick - tenor saxophone, soprano saxophone  
Gene Bertoncini - guitar
Bob Cranshaw  - bass
Mickey Roker - drums

References

Atlantic Records albums
Duke Pearson albums
1966 albums
Albums produced by Joel Dorn